Once More (also known as Encore) is a 1988 French drama film written and directed by Paul Vecchiali.

The film was entered into the main competition at the 45th edition of the Venice Film Festival, where it won the Filmcritica Award and a Special Golden Ciak Award.

Plot 
The film follows the life of Louis, who holds a trustworthy but subordinate job in a major company. He lives with his wife Sybèle and their daughter Anne-Marie, with whom he has a special relationship. He starts to grow sick of his seemingly mundane life, however, and starts to look for happiness elsewhere; this is where he starts discovering his attractions to men. He meets Yvan, a mysterious yet fascinating character, though the two do not pursue a sexual relationship. It is through Yvan however that Louis meets Frantz, a gay movie star. Their love only begins to unfurl the horrific events upon his horizon, which will ultimately change their lives forever.

Cast 

 Jean-Louis Rolland as Louis 
 Florence Giorgetti as Sybèle 
 Pascale Rocard as Anne-Marie 
 Nicolas Silberg as Yvan 
 Patrick Raynal as Frantz 
 Séverine Vincent as Immondice
 Albert Dupontel as Alain 
 Michel Gautier as Michel 
 Dora Doll as The Mother
 Catherine Becker as Cathy

References

External links

1988 drama films
French drama films
French LGBT-related films
Gay-related films
1988 LGBT-related films
1988 films
HIV/AIDS in French films
Films directed by Paul Vecchiali
LGBT-related drama films
1980s French films